Odum is a town in Wayne County, Georgia, United States. The population was 463 at the 2020 census.

History
The Georgia General Assembly incorporated Odum as a town in 1907. The community was named after Godfrey Odum, an early settler. The first Mayor was Dr. J. T. Colvin. J. A. Odum was an early councilman.

The Ritch–Carter–Martin House in Odum was added to the National Register of Historic Places in 1998.

Geography

Odum is located at  (31.666072, -82.028622).

According to the United States Census Bureau, the town has a total area of 1.9 square miles (5.0 km), all land.

Demographics

At of the 2000 census, there were 414 people, 163 households and 119 families residing in the town. The racial makeup of the town was 83.57% White, 13.53% African American, 0.24% Asian, 1.69% from other races, and 0.97% from two or more races. Hispanic or Latino of any race were 1.93% of the population.

There were 163 households, of which 33.7% had children under the age of 18 living with them, 61.3% were married couples living together, 8.0% had a female householder with no husband present, and 26.4% were non-families. 23.9% of all households were made up of individuals, and 12.9% had someone living alone who was 65 years of age or older. The average household size was 2.54 and the average family size was 3.03.

Age distribution was 25.8% under the age of 18, 8.2% from 18 to 24, 27.5% from 25 to 44, 24.2% from 45 to 64, and 14.3% who were 65 years of age or older. The median age was 37 years. For every 100 females, there were 101.0 males. For every 100 females age 18 and over, there were 91.9 males.

The median household income was $37,188, and the median family income was $36,719. Males had a median income of $28,250 versus $18,000 for females. The per capita income for the town was $15,699. About 11.8% of families and 13.2% of the population were below the poverty line, including 16.8% of those under age 18 and 7.6% of those age 65 or over.

References

Towns in Wayne County, Georgia
Towns in Georgia (U.S. state)